Mohd Nasir Zakaria (born 9 February 1976) is a Malaysian politician. From 2008 to 2013 he was the Member of the Parliament of Malaysia for the Padang Terap constituency in Kedah. He is a member of the opposition Pan-Malaysian Islamic Party (PAS).

Mohd Nasir was elected to Parliament in the 2008 election, defeating the incumbent UMNO member Ghazali Ibrahim by 369 votes. Prior to his election, he was a businessman. He lost his seat in the 2013 election to the former Menteri Besar (Chief Minister) of Kedah, Mahdzir Khalid, who had served for two terms as the state assemblyman for the seat of Pedu, which fell within Padang Terap's borders.

Election results

References

Living people
1976 births
People from Kedah
Former Malaysian Islamic Party politicians
National Trust Party (Malaysia) politicians
Malaysian people of Malay descent
Malaysian Muslims
Members of the Dewan Rakyat